Annie Emma Challice (1821–1875) was an English author. She wrote primarily about French history, specifically biographical collections of French philosophers and authors. She also wrote fiction.

Life
She was born Annie Emma Armstrong in London in 1821. She married physician John Challice. She died in London in 1875.

Bibliography
 The Sister of Charity: or, From Bermondsey to Belgravia. London: Bentley (1852). 
 The Wife's Temptation: A Tale of Belgravia. London: Westerton (1859). 
 The secret history of the court of France, under Louis XV. Ed. from rare and unpublished documents. London: Hurst and Blackett (1861). 
 Illustrious women of France, 1790-1873. New York: Scribner, Welford (1873).

References

1821 births
1875 deaths
Writers from London
19th-century English women writers
19th-century English writers